The 2014 Sydney Roosters season was the 107th in the club's history. They competed in the 2014 National Rugby League season. The Sydney Roosters opened their 2014 season against their long-time rivals the South Sydney Rabbitohs. In 2014, Trent Robinson coached the Sydney Roosters. Anthony Minichiello captained the team in 2014 along with four vice-captains in Boyd Cordner, Jake Friend, Mitchell Pearce and Jared Waerea-Hargreaves. The Sydney Roosters began 2014 by winning the World Club Challenge defeating the Wigan Warriors 36 – 14. The Sydney Roosters completed their 2014 regular season as Minor Premiers for the second year in a row, defeating the South Sydney Rabbitohs 22 – 18. The Sydney Roosters 2014 season ended in defeat against the South Sydney Rabbitohs 32 – 22.

2014 squad

Squad movements

2014 results

Auckland Nines

Pre-season

Regular season

Finals

Ladder

Player statistics

Representative honours

References

External links

 National Rugby League
 Rugby League Project
 Sydney Roosters
 Zero Tackle

Sydney Roosters seasons
Sydney Roosters season